Régénérée was a 40-gun Cocarde-class frigate of the French Navy. The British captured her in 1801 at the fall of Alexandria, named her HMS Alexandria, sailed her back to Britain, but never commissioned her. She was broken up in 1804.

Service
In 1796, she was commanded by captain Willaumez, in a squadron under Sercey. 

On 15 May 1796 Forte , Vertu, Seine, and Régénérée were cruising between St Helena and the Cape of Good Hope hoping to capture British East Indiamen when they encountered the British whaler  on her way to Walvis Bay. The French took off her crew, except for two seamen and a boy, and put Fortes fourth officer and 13-man prize crew aboard Lord Hawkesbury with orders to sail to  Île de France. On her way there one of the British seamen, who was at the helm, succeeded in running her aground on the east coast of Africa a little north of the Cape, wrecking her. There were no casualties, but the prize crew became British prisoners.

Régénérée reached Île de France where she took part in the action of 8 September 1796. 

On 26 April 1797 she captured the American ship Betsey and took her into Rochefort.

Between 24 and 27 April 1798, Régénérée and Vertu engaged the 32-gun sixth rate  in an inconclusive action when Pearl had to pass between them before she could take refuge in St George's Bay, Sierra Leone. The action cost Pearl one man mortally wounded.

In early 1800, Régénérée left Rochefort with Africaine to ferry supplies to Alexandria. At the action of 19 February 1801, HMS Phoebe, under Captain Robert Barlow, captured Africaine east of Gibraltar. However, Régénérée managed to complete her mission, sailing into Alexandria on 2 March, having eluded the British blockade. The day before she had passed through the British fleet answering signals and without arousing any suspicion, until at last she hoisted the French flag as she headed into the harbor.

She remained there during the siege until the capitulation of Alexandria on 29 September 1801. The British discovered the French warships Cause, Égyptienne, Justice and Régénérée, and two Venetian frigates in the harbour of Alexandria at the capitulation. The British and their Turkish allies agreed a division of the spoils. The British received Egyptienne, Régénérée and "Venetian No. 2" - Léoben (aka Le Bion; ex-Venetian Medusa) - of 26 guns. Capitan Pacha (sic) received the 64-gun Causse (ex-Venetian Vulcano), Justice, of 46 guns, and "Venetian No. 1" - Mantoue (ex-Venetian Cerere, ex-French Cérės) - also of 26 guns. Additionally, the Turks received some Turkish corvettes that were in the harbour. Admiral Lord Keith commander of the naval forces, gave the value of Régénérée for prize money purposes at £16,771 13s 6d.

Fate
She was then temporarily brought into Royal Navy service as HMS Alexandria. Captain Alexander Wilson, who had brought  to Alexandria and who had commanded the port, took command of Alexandria and sailed her back to Britain. She arrived in Portsmouth on 1 April 1802 from Malta. She sailed on 8 April for Chatham, where she was paid off; this was Wilson's last sea-going command. She was never commissioned and was broken up in 1804.

Notes, citations, and references
Notes

Citations

References

Lloyd, Christopher (ed.) (1950) The Keith Papers: Selected from the papers of Admiral Viscount Keith. (Printed for the Navy Records Society).
Williams, Greg H. (2009) The French assault on American shipping, 1793-1813: a history and comprehensive record of merchant marine losses. (McFarland). 
Wilson, Robert T. (1803) History of the British expedition to Egypt: to which is subjoined, a sketch ...'''
Wilson, John, and James Frederick Ferrier (1865) The Works of Professor Wilson of the University of Edinburgh: Essays critical and imaginative''.
  

Cocarde-class frigates
Ships built in France
Age of Sail frigates of France
1794 ships
Captured ships